These Four Walls is the seventh studio album by American singer-songwriter Shawn Colvin. It was released on September 12, 2006 by Nonesuch Records.

Track listing

Personnel
Shawn Colvin – vocals, guitar
John Leventhal – bass, dobro, guitar, mandolin, percussion, pedal steel guitar, keyboards
Shawn Pelton – drums, percussion
Greg Leisz – pedal steel guitar
RIck DePofi – organ, percussion, horn
Antoine Silverman – fiddle
Marc Cohn – vocals
Patty Griffin – vocals
Teddy Thompson – vocals
Production notes:
Shawn Colvin – producer
John Leventhal – producer, engineer, mixing
Fred Remmert – engineer
Rick DePofi – engineer
Matt Shane – studio assistant
Dan Mufson – studio assistant
Bob Ludwig – mastering
Maggie Taylor – artwork
Karina Benznicki – project supervisor
RoLisa Arzt – project coordinator
Eli Cane – project coordinator
Jill Dell'Abate – project coordinator
Traci Goudie – photography

Chart positions

References

2006 albums
Nonesuch Records albums
Shawn Colvin albums
Albums produced by John Leventhal